Furkan Nehat Motori (born 18 August 1995) is a Swedish footballer who plays for Österlen FF.

Career

Trelleborgs FF
Motori left Trelleborgs FF at the end of 2018, together with four other teammates.

Karlslunds IF
Motori joined Karlslunds IF on 18 March 2019.

References

External links 
 

Swedish footballers
Allsvenskan players
Ettan Fotboll players
1995 births
Living people
Trelleborgs FF players
Karlslunds IF players
Association football midfielders